Citrus root-knot nematode may refer to:

Tylenchulus semipenetrans
Meloidogyne citri
Meloidogyne fujianensis
Meloidogyne indica
Meloidogyne jianyangensis
Meloidogyne kongi 
Meloidogyne mingnanica

Animal common name disambiguation pages